James Haber is an American molecular biologist who is known for his discoveries in the field of DNA repair, in particular for his contributions to understanding the mechanisms of non-homologous end joining and Microhomology-mediated end joining, as well as homologous recombination. He has been a member of the National Academy of Sciences since 2010.

References

External links

United States National Academy of Sciences

Living people
Year of birth missing (living people)